After Life is a British black comedy-drama streaming television series created, written, produced, and directed by Ricky Gervais, who plays lead character Tony Johnson. It premiered on 8 March 2019 on Netflix. The second series premiered on 24 April 2020. The third and final series premiered on 14 January 2022.

Premise
Set in the fictional town of Tambury, After Life follows newspaper writer Tony Johnson, whose life is turned upside down after his wife dies from breast cancer. He contemplates suicide, but instead decides to spend his life punishing the world for his wife's death by saying and doing whatever he wants regardless of how it makes other people feel. Although he thinks of this as his "superpower", his plan is undermined when everyone around him pities him and tries to make him a better person.

Cast and characters

Main
 Ricky Gervais as Tony Johnson, head of feature stories at the local newspaper, the Tambury Gazette. Following the death of his wife, he is depressed and suicidal
 Tom Basden as Matt Braden, Tony's brother-in-law and boss of the Tambury Gazette
 Tony Way as Lenny, the Tambury Gazette's photographer
 Diane Morgan as Kath, the Gazette's advert manager
 Mandeep Dhillon as Sandy, a newly hired features journalist (series 1–2)
 Kerry Godliman as Lisa Johnson, Tony's deceased wife, seen in flashbacks and Tony's home videos
 Ashley Jensen as Emma, a nurse at the nursing home where Tony's dad is a resident
 Paul Kaye as Psychiatrist, Tony's and Matt's unconventional and incompetent psychiatrist (series 1–2)
 Penelope Wilton as Anne, a widow Tony meets at the local graveyard who dispenses sage advice for Tony's troubles
 Joe Wilkinson as Pat ('Postman Pat'), Tony's postman
 Roisin Conaty as Daphne/"Roxy", a sex worker who befriends Tony; a "tart with a heart". (series 1–2)
 David Bradley as Ray Johnson, Tony's dad, who has dementia (series 1–2; guest series 3)
 Tim Plester as Julian Kane, a drug addict hired by Matt to deliver the Tambury Gazette (series 1)
 David Earl as Brian Gittins, a hoarder and self-professed puppeteer and stand-up comedian; above all, he wants to appear in the local newspaper (series 2–3; recurring series 1)
 Jo Hartley as June, Lenny's girlfriend and mother to James (series 2–3; recurring series 1)
 Ethan Lawrence as James, June's son, who does work experience at the Tambury Gazette (series 2–3; recurring series 1)
 Colin Hoult as Ken Otley, head of the local amateur dramatics company and wannabe showbiz superstar (series 3; recurring series 2)
 Kath Hughes as Coleen, a new hire at the Gazette to replace Sandy (series 3; guest series 1)

Recurring
 Anti as Brandy the Dog, Tony's and Lisa's dog; Tony's best friend and reason to keep living
 Michelle Greenidge as Valerie, the Tambury Gazette's receptionist
 Tommy Finnegan as George Braden, son of Matt and Jill, Tony's nephew and godchild
 Thomas Bastable as Robbie, a classmate and reformed bully of George's
 Laura Patch as Jill Braden, Matt's wife (series 2–3; guest series 1)
 Tracy Ann Oberman as Rebecca, a woman with whom Tony goes on a date and who later reappears at an amateur dramatics workshop (series 2; guest series 1, 3)
 Peter Egan as Paul, the semi-retired owner of the Tambury Gazette (series 2–3)
 Robert Woodhall as Colin, a self-made millionaire scrap metal merchant whom Kath allows to drive her around in his Rolls-Royce (series 2–3)
 Bill Ward as Simon, Emma's new love interest, whom Tony dislikes (series 2)

Guest
 Annette Crosbie as Rosemary, a 100-year-old woman whom Tony interviews after she receives a telegram from the Queen (series 2)
 Holli Dempsey as Plastic Surgery Woman, a woman addicted to plastic surgery (series 2)
 Jo Enright as Vera, a woman who goes swinging with her husband (series 3)
 Kate Robbins as Penny (series 3)

Episodes

Series 1 (2019)

Series 2 (2020)

Series 3 (2022)

Production

Development
On 9 May 2018, it was announced Netflix had given the production a series order for a first season consisting of six episodes. The series was created and directed by Ricky Gervais, who is also executive producer, alongside Charlie Hanson. On 14 January 2019, it was announced the series would premiere on 8 March 2019. It was further announced Duncan Hayes would serve as an additional executive producer and that Hanson would actually serve as a producer. On 3 April 2019, it was announced the series was renewed for a second season, which premiered on 24 April 2020. On 6 May 2020, the show was renewed for a third season, the first time a fiction series created by Gervais had (excluding special episodes) been extended beyond two seasons.

Hanson was suspended from his position in the show during filming for the third season, due to eleven women saying he had committed sexual misconduct and assault against them between 2008 and 2015. Netflix said: "Whilst the allegations are unrelated to his time on the show, we immediately removed him from the production and referred the matter to the police." Gervais commented he was "shocked and appalled" to learn of the allegations, and Hanson claimed they were "demonstrably false" from the information given to him.

Casting
Alongside the series order announcement, it was confirmed Gervais would star in the show. On 5 July 2018, it was announced Penelope Wilton, David Bradley, Ashley Jensen, Tom Basden, Tony Way, David Earl, Joe Wilkinson, Kerry Godliman, Mandeep Dhillon, Jo Hartley, Roisin Conaty, and Diane Morgan had joined the cast.

Filming
Principal photography for the first series reportedly began by July 2018 in London. The series was filmed in Hampstead, Hemel Hempstead, The Royal Standard of England pub in and around Beaconsfield, and Camber Sands in East Sussex.

The third series of After Life began production in April 2021 and wrapped in June 2021.

Use of Aboriginal painting 
After the release of season 1, it was revealed that a copy of a 1987 painting by the Aboriginal Australian artist Warlimpirrnga Tjapaltjarri, which had been made by an artist commissioned to do so for a props company in 1999, had been prominently displayed in several scenes. Gervais's company agreed to pay compensation for using the copy of the work, entitled Tingarri Dreaming, as well as a fee for ongoing use of the work in season 2.

Reception

Critical response

Series 1
The first series received mixed to positive reviews upon its release. On Rotten Tomatoes, it has an overall approval rating of 73% with an average score of 6.6/10 based on 45 reviews. The site's critical consensus reads: "After Lifes first season teeters tonally between dark comedy and affecting drama, but Ricky Gervais' poignant performance illuminates new sides of the actor's talent". Metacritic, which uses a weighted average, assigned the first series a score of 59 out of 100 based on 15 critics, indicating "mixed or average reviews".

Merrill Barr from Forbes said of the series, "Overall, After Life is one hundred percent a series to check out. It's the Ricky Gervais project people have been begging for, for a long time." Josh Modell of AV Club states that After Life is a "dreary, sarcastic self-pity party that also manages—in a magic trick perhaps only Gervais is capable of pulling off—to constantly point out its protagonist's intellectual superiority" and that "as a meaningful meditation on grief, is dead on arrival".

Series 2
The second series received generally positive reviews from critics. On Rotten Tomatoes, it has a certified fresh approval rating of 77% with an average score of 6.8/10, based on 31 reviews. The site's critical consensus reads: "Though After Life's second season struggles to affirm its existence, it's a solid entry for anyone aching for a little more contemplative gallows humor." Metacritic assigned the second series a score of 62 out of 100 based on 6 critics, indicating "generally favourable reviews". The BBC reported mixed responses from critics. Ed Cumming from The Independent wrote: "all I see is a series constantly looking for easy solutions" and that "the script has a habit of using swearing where a joke ought to be".

Series 3
The third series received mixed reviews. On Rotten Tomatoes, it has 58% positive reviews with an average rating of 6 from 12 critics. Metacritic assigned the third series a score of 44 out of 100 based on 7 critics, indicating "mixed or average reviews". Louis Chilton for The Independent gave the series 2/5 stars, adding that it was "bogged down by sentimentality". Brian Lowry for CNN called the series "admirable" and "quirky", but felt "in the final analysis, the show never wholly [advances] beyond the initial appeal of its premise". The Radio Times gave it 3/5 stars and NME gave it a 4/5 star rating, adding that the series had ended "on a high"; the review's writer, James McMahon, felt that the series' final scene was "moving and poignant [...] among its creator's greatest works."

Accolades

Benches
Netflix has collaborated with suicide prevention charity Campaign Against Living Miserably (CALM) in a mental health initiative installing park benches all about the UK.

A bench is the setting across all three series where Anne, played by Penelope Wilton, sits beside Gervais's character, Tony.

Ricky Gervais is originally from Reading, where a bench has been installed at Henley Road Cemetery. 

{| class="wikitable sortable"
! Site !! Location
|-
| Victoria Park || Ashford
|-
| Sydney Gardens || Bath
|-
| Cofton Park || Birmingham
|-
| Ashton Court || Bristol
|-
| Parc Ceff Onn || Cardiff
|-
| Victoria Park || Cardiff
|-
| Calton Hill || Edinburgh
|-
| Gyllngdune Gardens || Falmouth
|-
| Glasgow Green || Glasgow
|-
| Stanley Park || Liverpool
|-
| Woolton Walled Gardens || Liverpool
|-
| Highgate Wood || London
|-
| Parliament Hill || London
|-
| Queens Park || London
|-
| Ravenscourt Park || London
|-
| Rookery Gardens & Woodland || London
|-
| York House Gardens || London
|-
| Wythenshawe Park || Manchester
|-
| Blenheim Gardens || Minehead
|-
| Exhibition Park || Newcastle
|-
| Aboretum || Nottingham
|-
| Highfields Park || Nottingham
|-
| Henley Road Cemetery || Reading
|-
| Lightwater Country Park || Surrey Heath
|-
| Vivary Park || Taunton
|}

References

External links

 
 

2019 British television series debuts
2022 British television series endings
2010s British black comedy television series
2010s British comedy-drama television series
2020s British black comedy television series
2020s British comedy-drama television series
English-language Netflix original programming
Television shows filmed in England
Television shows shot in London
Television series created by Ricky Gervais
Television series about journalism
Television series about widowhood
Fiction about superhuman features or abilities
Suicide in television
Television about mental health